Percival Slater (5 February 1879–1951) was an English footballer who played in the Football League for Bury and Manchester City.

References

1879 births
1951 deaths
English footballers
Association football forwards
English Football League players
Blackburn Rovers F.C. players
Chorley F.C. players
Manchester City F.C. players
Bury F.C. players
Oldham Athletic A.F.C. players
Altrincham F.C. players